Agaya Gangai is a 1982 Indian Tamil-language film, directed by Manobala in his debut and written by Manivannan. The film stars Karthik and Suhasini. It was released on 17 December 1982, and was a box office failure.

Plot 

Murali moves in as a tenant to Arumugam's house and befriends his daughter, Sumathi. The two are instantly attracted to each other. Sumathi is falling in love with Murali but withdraws as she's unsure of his intentions and is wary after hearing her cousin Janaki's own failed love story. Murali is confused and hurt by her mixed signals. Selvi is Aandal's daughter and is a playful young woman that does odd jobs for the families living in the house. When her mother dies suddenly, Murali steps up to care for her and Selvi assumes he loves her. The film focuses on the love triangle between the three and how it is ultimately resolved.

Cast 
Karthik as Murali
Suhasini as Sumathi
Usha Rajendar as Selvi
Goundamani as Arumugam
S. N. Parvathy as Sumathi's mother
Kamala Kamesh as Aandal
Vadivukkarasi as Janaki Gopal
Thyagu as Gopal

Soundtrack 
The music was composed by Ilaiyaraaja.

References

External links 
 

1980s Tamil-language films
1982 directorial debut films
1982 films
Films directed by Manobala
Films scored by Ilaiyaraaja